Charles Alston Cooke, or Cook (1848–1917) was an American politician and jurist in North Carolina and later in Oklahoma.

Cooke served as a member of the North Carolina House of Representatives and the North Carolina Senate, representing Warren County, as U.S. Attorney for the Eastern District of North Carolina (1889–1893) and later as an associate justice of the North Carolina Supreme Court (1901–1903).

Cooke moved to Muskogee, Oklahoma in 1903 and became a prominent lawyer and politician there as well. A Republican, he was elected to the Oklahoma House of Representatives in 1908 and was his party's unsuccessful nominee for the Oklahoma Supreme Court in 1912 and for Congress in 1914.

References

External links
North Carolina Reports By North Carolina Supreme Court, 1919
The James Sprunt Studies in History and Political Science
North Carolina Manual, 1913, p. 839
North Carolina Manual, 1913, p. 447
OurCampaigns.com
Historic House Membership. Oklahoma House of Representatives.

1848 births
1917 deaths
North Carolina state senators
Members of the North Carolina House of Representatives
Justices of the North Carolina Supreme Court
20th-century Members of the Oklahoma House of Representatives
United States Attorneys for the Eastern District of North Carolina
19th-century American judges
Republican Party members of the Oklahoma House of Representatives